Savia or SAVIA can refer to:
Savia (plant), a plant genus
Pannonia Savia, a Roman province created in the 3rd century AD
Savia, a 9th century Slavic principality in Lower Pannonia
Ezio Della Savia (born 1942), Italian swimmer
Savia (album), an album by the J-pop singer Mami Kawada
Savia (band), a Spanish rock band